Martha P. Tedeschi (born April 1, 1958) is an American art historian and curator. Tedeschi currently serves as the Elizabeth and John Moors Cabot Director of the Harvard Art Museums. She is a scholar of nineteenth-century American and British prints and drawings, especially works by artists such as Winslow Homer, John Marin, and James McNeill Whistler.

Career
Born to John and Anne, Tedeschi received a Bachelor of Arts in Art History from Brown University in 1980, and a Master of Arts in Art History and Museum Studies from the University of Michigan in 1982. Her thesis at Michigan focused on Girolamo Mocetto and was titled "The Calumny of Appelles: An Early Sixteenth-Century Engraving by Girolamo Mocetto." In 1994, Tedeschi received a Doctor of Philosophy in Art History from Northwestern University. Her dissertation, supervised by S. Hollis Clayson and Nancy J. Troy, was titled "How Prints Work: Reproductions, Originals, and Their Markets in England, 1840–1900."

In 1999, Tedeschi was named the Print Trust Curator of Prints and Drawings at the Art Institute of Chicago. In 2012, she was promoted to Deputy Director for Art and Research. Four years later, she was named the Elizabeth and John Moors Cabot Director of the Harvard Art Museums, succeeding Thomas W. Lentz.

Tedeschi is a member of the Association of Art Museum Curators, the Association of Art Museum Directors, and has served as President of the Print Council of America from 2009 through 2013. She has published extensively within the academic journal Print Quarterly.

Personal life
Tedeschi is married to Michael Lukasiewicz, with whom she has two children: Samuel and Jacob.

Select works
Great Drawings from the Art Institute of Chicago: The Harold Joachim Years, 1958–1983, 1985, 
The Lithographs of James McNeill Whistler, with Nesta Spink, 1998, 
The "Writing" of Modern Life: The Etching Revival in France, Britain, and U.S., 1850-1940, with Elizabeth Helsinger, 2008, 
Watercolors by Winslow Homer: The Color of Light, with Kristi Dahm et al., 2008, 
John Marin's Watercolors: A Medium for Modernism, with Kristi Dahm et al., 2010, 
Coming Away: Winslow Homer and England, with Elizabeth Athens et al., 2017,

See also
List of Brown University alumni
List of female art museum directors
List of Northwestern University alumni
List of University of Michigan arts alumni

References

External links
 Harvard Art Museums profile

1958 births
Living people
Brown University alumni
University of Michigan alumni
Northwestern University alumni
American art historians
Women art historians
Women museum directors
Directors of museums in the United States
Art Institute of Chicago
Harvard University administrators